Philippe Jacquin (22 January 1942 – 28 September 2002) was a French anthropologist.

Scientific literature 
Jacquin published 20 books, including: American Indians, The Indian Policy of the United States (1830–1890), and The American people: origins, immigration, ethnicity. These are reference books on the history of Native Americans, including the blending of cultures and the initial conquest of the American West.

Bibliography 
 Histoire des Indiens d'Amérique du Nord, Payot, 1976
 Les Indiens blancs. Français et Indiens en Amérique du Nord, XVIᵉ-XVIIIᵉ siècles, Payot, 1987
 La terre des Peaux-Rouges, coll. « Découvertes Gallimard » (nº 14), série Histoire. Éditions Gallimard, 1987
 Vers l'Ouest : Un nouveau monde, coll. « Découvertes Gallimard » (nº 25), série Histoire. Éditions Gallimard, 1987
 Sous le pavillon noir : Pirates et flibustiers, coll. « Découvertes Gallimard » (nº 45), série Histoire. Éditions Gallimard, 1988
 Terre indienne, Philippe Jacquin, Éd. Autrement, 1991
 Le Cow-boy. Un Américain entre le mythe et l'histoire, Éditions Albin Michel, 1992
 With Daniel Royot, Le mythe de l'Ouest : l'Ouest américain et les valeurs de la frontière, Éd. Autrement, 1993
 Les Indiens d'Amérique, Flammarion, 1996
 La politique indienne des États-Unis (1830–1890), Éd. Didier Erudition, 1996
 With Patrick Villiers & Pierre Ragon, Les Européens et la mer : de la découverte à la colonisation (1455–1860), Éd. Ellipses Marketing, 1997
 L'herbe des dieux. Le tabac dans les sociétés indiennes d'Amérique du Nord, Éd. Musee-Galerie De La Seita, 1997
 With Daniel Royot, La destinée manifeste des États-Unis au XIXᵉ, Éd. Ploton, 1999
 Le peuple américain : origines, immigration, ethnicité, identité, Seuil, 2000
 With Jean-Marie Michaud, Les Indiens, quelle histoire !, Casterman, 2001
 With Daniel Royot, Go West ! Histoire de l'Ouest américain d'hier à aujourd'hui, Flammarion, 2002
 La vie des pionniers au temps de la conquête de l'Ouest, Larousse, 2002
 Grandes civilisations : Afrique, Amérique, Asie, Europe, Océanie, Larousse, 2003 (under the direction of José Garanger)
 L'Europe des grands royaumes, Casterman, 2006

1942 births
2002 deaths
French anthropologists
20th-century anthropologists